Intermenstrual bleeding, previously known as metrorrhagia, is uterine bleeding at irregular intervals, particularly between the expected menstrual periods. It is a cause of vaginal bleeding.

In some women, menstrual spotting between periods occurs as a normal and harmless part of ovulation. Some women experience acute mid-cycle abdominal pain around the time of ovulation (sometimes referred to by the German term for this phenomenon, mittelschmerz). This may also occur at the same time as menstrual spotting. The term breakthrough bleeding or breakthrough spotting is usually used for women using hormonal contraceptives, such as IUDs or oral contraceptives, in which it refers to bleeding or spotting between any expected withdrawal bleedings, or bleeding or spotting at any time if none is expected. If spotting continues beyond the first 3-4 cycles of oral contraceptive use, a woman should have her prescription adjusted to a pill containing higher estrogen:progesterone ratio by either increasing the estrogen dose or decreasing the relative progestin dose.

Besides the aforementioned physiologic forms, metrorrhagia may also represent abnormal uterine bleeding and be a sign of an underlying disorder, such as hormone imbalance, endometriosis, uterine fibroids, uterine cancer, or vaginal cancer.

If the bleeding is repeated and heavy, it can cause significant iron-deficiency anemia.

Cause
Intermittent spotting between periods can result from any of numerous reproductive system disorders:

Neoplasia:
 Cervical cancer
 Uterine cancer
 Vaginal cancer
 Endometrial cancer
 Primary fallopian tube cancer
 Ovarian cancer

Inflammation:
 Cervicitis
 Endometritis
 Vaginitis
 Sexually Transmitted Infections
 Pelvic inflammatory disease

Endometrial abnormalities:
 Endometriosis
 Adenomyosis
 Uterine leiomyomas
 Endometrial hyperplasia
 Polyps

Endocrinological causes:
 Hormone imbalance
 Dysfunctional uterine bleeding
 Diets which induce ketosis, such as the Atkins diet
 polycystic ovarian syndrome

Bleeding disorders:
 Von Willebrand Disease
 Pancytopenia due to leukemia

Drug induced:
 Use of progestin-only contraceptives, such as Depo Provera
 Change in oral contraception
 Overdose of anticoagulant medication or Aspirine abuse

Traumatic causes:
 Automutilation
 Sexual abuse or rape

Related to pregnancy:
 Implantation bleeding
 Ectopic pregnancy
 (Incomplete) miscarriage

Other causes:
 Enlarged uterus with menorrhea

Breakthrough bleeding
Breakthrough bleeding (BTB) is any of various forms of vaginal bleeding, usually referring to mid-cycle bleeding in users of combined oral contraceptives, as attributed to insufficient estrogens. It may also occur with other hormonal contraceptives. Sometimes, breakthrough bleeding is classified as abnormal and thereby as a form of metrorrhagia, and sometimes it is classified as not abnormal.

In the context of hemophilia, the term describes a bleeding that occurs while a patient is on prophylaxis.

Presentation
The bleeding is usually light, often referred to as "spotting," though a few people may experience heavier bleeding.

It is estimated that breakthrough bleeding affects around 25 % of combined oral contraceptive pill (COCP) users during the initial 3 to 4 months of use, it then usually resolves on its own.

Mechanism
Breakthrough bleeding is commonly due to 4 factors: physiologic effects  of  OCs  on  the  endometrium,  OC-related  parameters,  (dose, formulation,  and  regimen),  patient behavior, (compliance,  using concomitant  medications,  and  smoking) and benign or malignant pathology.

Treatment
Breakthrough bleeding that does not resolve on its own is a common reason for women to switch to different pill formulations, or to switch to a non-hormonal method of birth control.

Terminology
Metrorrhagia is from metro = measure, -rrhagia = abnormal flow. The term is no longer recommended.

See also
 Menometrorrhagia
 Istihadha
 Menstruation
 Menstruation in Islam
 Postcoital bleeding
 Vaginal bleeding
 Withdrawal bleeding
 Culture and menstruation

References

External links 

Menstrual disorders